Chilkasa is a monotypic moth genus in the family Erebidae. Its only species, Chilkasa falcata, is found in India, Thailand, Peninsular Malaysia, Sumatra, Borneo and the Philippines. Both the genus and the species were first described by Swinhoe in 1885.

References

Calpinae
Moths of Asia
Moths described in 1885
Monotypic moth genera